Canton may refer to:

Administrative division terminology 
 Canton (administrative division), territorial/administrative division in some countries, notably Switzerland
 Township (Canada), known as canton in Canadian French

Arts and entertainment
 Canton (band), an Italian synth pop group
 "Canton" (song) by Japan
 Canton, a fictional town in "Jaynestown", an episode of Firefly

Design
 Canton (building), a corner pilaster
 Canton (flag), an emblem placed in the top left quarter of a flag
 Canton (heraldry), a square or other charge (symbol) occupying the upper left corner of a coat of arms
 Canton porcelain, Chinese ceramic ware

People 
 Canton (surname), and list of people with the surname
 Canton Jones, American Christian music/hip-hop artist

Places

Canada 
 Canton, New Brunswick, a community in Drummond Parish, New Brunswick
 Canton, Ontario

China 
 Guangdong (Canton Province), province in southern China
 Guangzhou (Canton City), capital of Guangdong Province
 Canton River (Pearl River), a river in southern China near Guangzhou
 Canton Road, Hong Kong

United States 
 Canton, Connecticut
 Canton, Georgia
 Canton, Illinois
 New Canton, Illinois
 Canton, Indiana
 Canton, Iowa
 Canton, Kansas
 Canton, Maine
 Canton, Baltimore, Maryland, a neighborhood and park
 Canton, Massachusetts
 Canton, Michigan
 Canton, Minnesota
 Canton, Mississippi
 Canton, Missouri
 Canton, Montana, a former town now situated under Canyon Ferry Lake
 Canton, New Jersey
 Canton, New York, a town
 Canton (village), New York
 Canton, North Carolina
 Canton City, North Dakota
 West Canton, North Carolina
 Canton, Ohio
 East Canton, Ohio
 North Canton, Ohio
 Canton, Oklahoma
 Canton, Pennsylvania
 Canton, South Dakota
 Canton, Texas
 Canton, West Virginia
 Canton, Wisconsin, a town
 Canton, Barron County, Wisconsin, an unincorporated community
 Canton River (United States), a river in Canton, Massachusetts, United States
 Canton Township (disambiguation)

Other countries 
 Canton, Cardiff, Wales, UK
 Canton (Cardiff electoral ward)
 Canton Beach, New South Wales, Australia
 Canton Island, Kiribati

Other uses 
 Canton (1790 EIC ship), an East Indiaman
 Canton (basketball), a 1906–1907 basketball team in Canton, Ohio, US
 Canton (liqueur), a ginger-flavored liqueur
 Cantoning, the division of soldiers into groups for the purpose of billeting on campaign or to garrison a territory
 Cantonment, soldiers encamped and awaiting action
 Canton Fair, a biannual trade fair in Canton (Guangzhou), China
 Canton System, a Chinese trade policy from 1757 to 1842
 Canton System (Prussia), unrelated to the above - a system of recruitment to the Prussian Army
 A metonym for the Pro Football Hall of Fame, located in Canton, Ohio, US
 Canton Electronics, German loudspeaker manufacturer

See also 
 Kanton (disambiguation)
 Cantone (disambiguation)
 Cantonese (disambiguation)
 Guangzhou (disambiguation)
 Cantons of Switzerland
 Cantonist, sons of Russian conscripts who were educated in special canton schools
 East Cantons, a region of eastern Belgium
 Afrin Canton, one of the cantons of the autonomous Democratic Federation of Northern Syria
 Shahba Canton, one of the cantons of the autonomous Democratic Federation of Northern Syria
 Pancit canton, a Philippine noodle dish